Rudník is a village and municipality in Košice-okolie District in the Košice Region of eastern Slovakia.

History
In historical records the village was first mentioned in 1255.

Geography
The village lies at an altitude of 314 metres and covers an area of 23.004 km².
It has a population of about 610 people.

Ethnicity
The population is almost entirely Slovak in ethnicity.

Culture
The village has a general store. In the village is the historic church of St. Juraja (St. George) and the House of Culture (social gathering hall).  Three kilometers above the village is the church of St. Anne.

Transport
There is a bus line from Košice to the village.

External links
http://www.statistics.sk/mosmis/eng/run.html

Villages and municipalities in Košice-okolie District